Leucopogon neoanglicus, commonly known as New England beard heath, is a species of flowering plant in the heath family Ericaceae and is endemic to eastern Australia. It is an erect shrub with egg-shaped leaves, sometimes with the narrower end towards the base, and white, tube-shaped flowers arranged singly in leaf axils and bearded inside.

Description
The leaves are glabrous with 3 parallel veins in the centre and others spreading.

Taxonomy
Leucopogon neoanglicus was first formally described in 1868 by George Bentham in his Flora Australiensis from an unpublished description by Ferdinand von Mueller.

Distribution and habitat

References

neoanglicus
Flora of Queensland
Flora of New South Wales
Plants described in 1868
Taxa named by George Bentham